The 2018 Mole Valley District Council election took place on 3 May 2018 to elect approximately one-third of members to Mole Valley District Council in England, coinciding with other local elections. The Conservatives went into the elections with a majority of 1, but lost control of the council, leaving it with no overall majority. The 2018 election results are compared (in terms of percentage points gained or lost) against the results when these wards were last contested four years previously, in 2014.

Results

Ward Results

Ashtead Common

Ashtead Park

Ashtead Village

Bookham North

Bookham South

Brockham, Betchworth and Buckland

Capel, Leigh and Newdigate

Dorking North

Dorking South

Fetcham East

Fetcham West

Holmwoods

Leatherhead North

Leatherhead South

References

Mole Valley
Mole Valley District Council elections
May 2018 events in the United Kingdom
2010s in Surrey